Peter Michael Hillier (born 14 November 1977) is a dancer born in Cambridge, England.

He trained at the McKenzie School of Speech and Drama and the Bodywork Dance Studios, both in Cambridge.

Television career 
Hillier is best known for his role as a male presenter on the BAFTA award-winning BBC children's music programme Boogie Beebies, alongside Nataylia Roni.

As well as presenting, he dances, teaches dance, sings, does stand-up comedy, and is a choreographer and director. He has choreographed fashion and exhibition shows.

Hillier now works at Stagecoach Northampton alongside actress Alison Pargeter.

Selected credits

Television
 2004–present: Boogie Beebies BBC – self

Theatre
 2010 to 2011 Dec–Jan: Snow White pantomime at The Grand Theatre, Swansea, playing Muddles.
 2009:to 2010 Boogie Pete Live (UK tour)
 2008:  Jack and the Beanstalk pantomime at Darlington Civic Theatre playing Jack Trot.
 2007–2008: Aladdin  Pantomime at Pavilion Theatre, Rhyl – Director, Wishee Washee
 2007:  Boogie Nights  theatre tour with Qdos Productions – Terry
 2004–2005: Saturday Night Fever  at  Apollo Victoria Theatre, London – Gus
 2001–2002: Kiss Me, Kate''  at  Victoria Palace Theatre, London

External links 
 Interview for The Northern Echo
 Boogie Beebies review at Bad TV Redeemed
Boogie Beebies website
UK Productions Website – Aladdin at Rhyl
 Saturday Night Fever interview
Guest Teacher with the Bedford Musical Theatre Company
Boogie Pete at MySpace

References

1977 births
Living people
English male television actors
English male dancers
People from Cambridge
Male actors from Cambridgeshire